Tyrann may refer to

The Stars, Like Dust, a novel by Isaac Asimov serialized in Galaxy Science Fiction as Tyrann
The fictional planet Tyrann, part of Asimov's Foundation universe continuity
Tyrann Mathieu, American football player